Nemeth Parasol was a prototype of a taildragger tractor configuration airplane with circular wing set in a parasol configuration. It was designed by Steven Nemeth from Dayton, Ohio and made its first flight in 1934. The goal was to have a plane that could be stored in a large garage, rather than a hangar and be easy to fly. Nemeth did wind tunnel tests at the University of Michigan in 1929. Nemeth worked with students from the University of Miami in 1934 to help him build the plane's wings. Nemeth used his custom "roundwing" on an Alliance A-1 Argo two-seat biplane fuselage. The high-wing monoplane had multiple struts to hold the custom "roundwing". Due to the large wing, the plane could taking off in just . Tests were done with stall speeds, turning off the engine in flight, and using the wings as a parachute. The parachute-stall landing gave the plane a short 25 feet of landing to stop. The original 90 hp Lambert engine in the Alliance A-1 was replaced with a Warner Scarab 120 hp engine. Nemeth did two years of testing but did not get any interest in producing more. The fate of the one plane built is unknown. Nemeth success gave others ideas and other experimental aircraft with circular wings were built later like the Sack AS-6, the Vought XF5U and the Avrocar. (Note: Nemeth is sometimes spelled Nuneth.) Steven P. Nemeth was a flight instructor at the McCook Field near Dayton, Ohio, which closed in 1927. The successful test flights made it into some newspapers and magazines. Modern Mechanix and Popular Science both had articles on the special new plane.

Specifications
(Note: Stall speed was called 0 mph, as the engine was turned off for the landing test.)

References

External links
 The Nemeth Parasol – A Parachuting Plane Ed Nash's Military Matters, YouTube

Single-engined tractor aircraft
Circular wing
Parasol-wing aircraft